The Italy women's national beach handball team is the national team of Italy. It is governed by the Italian Handball Federation and takes part in international beach handball competitions.

In 2012 the coach is Tamas Neukum.

Results
In his history the team won one edition of World Games (2009) and one of the European Championships (2004).

World Championship

European Championship

World Games

See also
Italy women's national handball team

References

External links
Official website
IHF profile

Beach handball
Women's national beach handball teams